Major-General Sir Edmund Guy Tulloch Bainbridge  (11 November 1867 – 27 September 1943) was a British Army officer who commanded 25th Division during the First World War.

Early life and education

He was eldest son of late Colonel Sir Edmond Bainbridge, KCB of the Royal Artillery. He was educated at Marlborough College and the Royal Military College, Sandhurst.

Military career
Bainbridge joined the Royal East Kent Regiment (The Buffs) in 1888 and took part in the Dongola expedition in 1896 and the Nile expedition of 1897 and fought at the Battle of Omdurman in 1898. He commanded the 7th Mounted Infantry during the Second Boer War and took part in the Battle of Paardeberg in 1900. In 1903 he took command of the School of Mounted Infantry at Kilworth.

He fought in the First World War, from April 1915, as Commander of 110th (Leicester) Infantry Brigade and, from June 1916, as General Officer Commanding (GOC) 25th Division. The Division went on to fight at the Battle of the Somme, at the Battle of Messines, at the Battle of Passchendaele, in the German offensive of March/April 1918 and at the Battle of Aisne under his leadership.

After the War he became General Officer Commanding 1st Division before retiring in 1923.

References

1867 births
1943 deaths
British Army major generals
Military personnel from Kent
British Army generals of World War I
Knights Commander of the Order of the Bath
People educated at Marlborough College
Graduates of the Royal Military College, Sandhurst
Buffs (Royal East Kent Regiment) officers
British Army personnel of the Mahdist War
British Army personnel of the Second Boer War
People from Charlton, London
People from Newtown, Hampshire